The Coach Wooden "Keys to Life" Award is presented annually to a member of the college or professional basketball community who lives out qualities exemplified by Coach Wooden: outstanding character, integrity, and leadership on the court, in the work place, in the home, and in the community. The award was established in 1998 and was named for head coach John Wooden, who coached at UCLA for 27 years, compiling 620 wins in 767 games. He was inducted into the National Collegiate Basketball Hall of Fame in 2006.

Winners

References

External links 
Official website

Awards established in 1998
College basketball coaching awards in the United States